Karaj railway station (Persian:ايستگاه راه آهن کرج, Istgah-e Rah Ahan-e Karaj) is located in Karaj, Alborz Province. The station is owned by IRI Railway. The station is 1.8 km south of Karaj Metro Station, which serves Tehran Metro Line 5.

Service summary
Note: Classifications are unofficial and only to best reflect the type of service offered on each path
Meaning of Classifications:
Local Service: Services originating from a major city, and running outwards, with stops at all stations
Regional Service: Services connecting two major centres, with stops at almost all stations
InterRegio Service: Services connecting two major centres, with stops at major and some minor stations
InterRegio-Express Service:Services connecting two major centres, with stops at major stations
InterCity Service: Services connecting two (or more) major centres, with no stops in between, with the sole purpose of connecting said centres.

References

External links

Railway stations in Iran